Roman Magdziarczyk (born 5 July 1977 in Wałbrzych) is a Polish race walker.

Achievements

References

1977 births
Living people
Polish male racewalkers
Athletes (track and field) at the 2000 Summer Olympics
Athletes (track and field) at the 2004 Summer Olympics
Olympic athletes of Poland
People from Wałbrzych
Sportspeople from Lower Silesian Voivodeship